The Daniel School was built in Daniel, Wyoming by contractor A.F. Atwood in 1920.  The rural school served Daniel and its surrounding area, replacing improvised school facilities. In 1939, the Daniel district was consolidated, and students were bused to Pinedale for classes. Following consolidation, the Daniel School stood empty until the Daniel Homemaker Club acquired and renovated the building. It is a representative of a typical one-room schoolhouse from the early 20th century, and it has been the object of field trips by classes seeking to experience the historical learning environment.

The school was built to a design from an architectural plan book with a single main room that could be divided by a movable partition. The one story building features a hipped roof and is entered from a closed porch that is topped by a bell tower. The original bell remains in place. The school housed about twenty students.

The Daniel School was placed on the National Register of Historic Places in 1990.

References

External links
 Daniel School at the Wyoming State Historic Preservation Office

Buildings and structures in Sublette County, Wyoming
Defunct schools in Wyoming
School buildings on the National Register of Historic Places in Wyoming
One-room schoolhouses in Wyoming
Historic districts on the National Register of Historic Places in Wyoming
National Register of Historic Places in Sublette County, Wyoming